Alfonso D. Boone (born January 11, 1976) is a former American football defensive end who played ten seasons in the National Football League. He was drafted by the Detroit Lions in the seventh round of the 2000 NFL Draft. He played college football at Mt. San Antonio College.

Boone has also played for the Chicago Bears and Kansas City Chiefs.

Early years
Boone attended Arthur Hill High School in Saginaw, Michigan and was a letterman in football.

References

External links

Kansas City Chiefs bio
San Diego Chargers bio

1976 births
Living people
Sportspeople from Saginaw, Michigan
Players of American football from Michigan
American football defensive tackles
American football defensive ends
Detroit Lions players
Chicago Bears players
Kansas City Chiefs players
San Diego Chargers players
Mt. SAC Mounties football players